Red Post Bridge is a small village in the civil parish of Monxton in the Test Valley district of Hampshire, England. Its nearest town is Andover, which lies approximately 2.75 miles (4.4. km) north-east from the village.

Villages in Hampshire
Test Valley